Jiri Nissinen (born 30 May 1997) is a Finnish professional footballer who plays for IFK Mariehamn, as a defender.

Club career
For the 2022 season, he returned to IFK Mariehamn after playing there on loan in the previous season.

References

1997 births
Living people
Finnish footballers
Pallo-Kerho 37 players
Kuopion Palloseura players
SC Kuopio Futis-98 players
IFK Mariehamn players
Vaasan Palloseura players
Veikkausliiga players
Kakkonen players
Association football midfielders